Dooly County School District is a public school district in Dooly County, Georgia, United States, based in Vienna. It serves the communities of Byromville, Dooling, Lilly, Pinehurst, Unadilla, and Vienna.

Schools
The Dooly County School District has one elementary school, one middle school, and one high school.

Elementary school 
Dooly County K-8 Academy

Middle school
Dooly County K-8 Academy

High school
Dooly County High School

References

External links

School districts in Georgia (U.S. state)
Education in Dooly County, Georgia